Juromenha is a town in southeastern Portugal, near the border with Spain. It is part of Alandroal Municipality.

See also
Castelo de Juromenha

Alandroal